The Upsilon meson is a quarkonium state (i.e. flavourless meson) formed from a bottom quark and its antiparticle. It was discovered by the E288 experiment team, headed by Leon Lederman, at Fermilab in 1977, and was the first particle containing a bottom quark to be discovered because it is the lightest that can be produced without additional massive particles.

See also
 Oops-Leon, an erroneously-claimed discovery of a similar particle at a lower mass in 1976.
 The  particle is the analogous state made from strange quarks.
 The  particle is the analogous state made from charm quarks.
 List of mesons

References

Mesons
Onia
Subatomic particles with spin 1